Omar El-Wakil (born 14 May 1988) is an Egyptian handball player for Zamalek and the Egyptian national team.

He represented Egypt at the World Men's Handball Championship in 2015, 2019, and 2021.

He also represented Egypt at the Olympic games Tokyo 2021 . 

Omar El-wakil got the best left wing in African championship 2022 in Egypt. 

He got the best left wing in Arab championship 2022 in Tunisia. 

El-Wakil graduated with a chemical engineering degree from Cairo University.

References

Living people
1988 births
Egyptian male handball players
Olympic handball players of Egypt
Handball players at the 2020 Summer Olympics
Competitors at the 2019 African Games
African Games gold medalists for Egypt
African Games medalists in handball
Cairo University alumni
Competitors at the 2022 Mediterranean Games
Mediterranean Games silver medalists for Egypt
Mediterranean Games medalists in handball
21st-century Egyptian people